Plyos may refer to:

 Plyometrics, or jump training
 Plyos, Ivanovo Oblast, a town in Russia

See also
 Ples (disambiguation)
 Pleš (disambiguation)